General elections in the Luhansk People's Republic were held on November 11, 2018.

Just like in 2014, at the same time, similar elections were held in the Donetsk People's Republic.

The elections took place on November 11, 2018. The Head of the LPR and the People's Council of the LPR (consisting of 50 deputies) were elected.

Eight candidates expressed their desire to participate in the elections - Oleg Valerievich Koval, Leonid Ivanovich Pasechnik, Natalya Vladimirovna Sergun, Lyudmila Valentinovna Rusnak, Leonid Nesterovich Derzhak, Roman Teodorovich Oleksin, Vladimir Alexandrovich Rodionov, Yuri Mikhailovich Ryaplov.

Results 
The current head of the LPR Leonid Pasechnik won with 68.3% of the vote. The Peace for Lugansk Region Movement won the parliamentary elections with 74.13% of voters' support. Opponents from the Luhansk Economic Union received 25.16% of the vote. 0.72% of ballots were declared invalid and lost.

Head of the Republic

People's Council 

 Peace for Lugansk Region - 37 seats
 Luhansk Economic Union - 13 seats

Opinions 
The EU does not recognize the elections in the LPR and imposed sanctions against their organizers.

 The elections of the heads of the Republics and deputies of the People's Councils held in the LPR and DPR do not contradict the letter and spirit of the Minsk agreements, the representative of the Republic in the humanitarian subgroup of the Contact Group, head of the LPR working group on the exchange of prisoners of war Olga Kobtseva said.

References 

2018 elections in Europe